The 1984 Dwars door België was the 39th edition of the Dwars door Vlaanderen cycle race and was held on 22 March 1984. The race started and finished in Waregem. The race was won by Walter Planckaert.

General classification

References

1984
1984 in road cycling
1984 in Belgian sport
March 1984 sports events in Europe